Acamptus rigidus is a species of true weevil in the family of beetles known as Curculionidae. It is found in North America.

References

Cossoninae
Articles created by Qbugbot
Beetles described in 1876